Lt.-Col. Thomas Stokes George Hughes Robertson-Aikman  (25 February 1860 – 18 April 1948) was a Scottish soldier and curler.

Early life
Robertson-Aikman was educated at the Eton College and the Brasenose College, Oxford.

Soldier
Robertson-Aikman joined the 1st battalion, Royal Lanark Militia, in 1880. The following year the militia regiment was merged with the Highland Light Infantry (HLI). He commanded the 4th battalion HLI 1900–12, and during World War I, he commanded a district of the Royal Defence Corps. He was appointed CB in the 1923 King's Birthday Honours.

Curler
Robertson-Aikman was non-playing captain of the British curling team which won the gold medal at the 1924 Winter Olympics in Chamonix (France). Other team members were Laurence Jackson, Robin Welsh, William K. Jackson, Thomas Murray, John McLeod, William Brown and D. G. Astley. Sweden and France won the silver and bronze medals respectively.

See also
 Curling at the 1924 Winter Olympics

References
 AIKMAN, Col Thomas S. G. H. Robertson-, Who Was Who, A & C Black, 1920–2016 (online edition, Oxford University Press, 2014)

External links
 
 

1860 births
1948 deaths
Scottish male curlers
British male curlers
Olympic curlers of Great Britain
Olympic gold medallists for Great Britain
Olympic medalists in curling
Curlers at the 1924 Winter Olympics
People educated at Eton College
Alumni of Brasenose College, Oxford
Highland Light Infantry officers
British Army personnel of World War I
Royal Defence Corps officers
Military personnel from Leicester
Scottish Olympic medallists